The 1993 All-Ireland Senior Ladies' Football Championship Final was the twentieth All-Ireland Final and the deciding match of the 1993 All-Ireland Senior Ladies' Football Championship, an inter-county ladies' Gaelic football tournament for the top teams in Ireland.

An inexperienced Laois team lost a fourth final in a row as Kerry won by eight points.

References

!
All-Ireland Senior Ladies' Football Championship Finals
All-Ireland
Kerry county ladies' football team matches
Laois county ladies' football team matches